A special election was held October 2, 1827 in  to fill a vacancy caused by the resignation of Louis McLane (J) before the start of Congress, after being elected to the Senate

Election results

Johns took his seat on December 3, 1827

See also
List of special elections to the United States House of Representatives

References

Delaware 1827 at-large
Delaware 1827 at-large
1827 at-large
Delaware at-large
United States House of Representatives at-large
United States House of Representatives 1827 At-large